Karel Večeřa (born 9 October 1955 in Ivančice) is a Czech football manager and former footballer.

In 2006–2009 he led FC Baník Ostrava. He was very popular and known for his bet with fans of FC Baník Ostrava. Fans said that if Baník ends in a third position in season 2007–08, allowing them to play UEFA Cup, and if he will shave his moustache, they will buy him 1922 bars of chocolate, as the football club was founded in 1922. Fans can saw him without his moustache, which he had for 34 years, as Baník ended in a third position that year.

As active player, Večeřa played for several clubs, including FC Zbrojovka Brno and VP Frýdek-Místek. As a manager, he coached among others FK Drnovice, 1. FC Brno and FC Vysočina Jihlava.

References

1955 births
Czech footballers
Czechoslovak footballers
Czech football managers
Czech First League managers
FC Zbrojovka Brno players
FC Zbrojovka Brno managers
FC Vysočina Jihlava managers
FC Baník Ostrava managers
Living people
Association footballers not categorized by position
People from Ivančice
FK Frýdek-Místek players
FK Drnovice managers
Sportspeople from the South Moravian Region